The 1999 MAAC men's basketball tournament was held February 26–March 1, 1999 at Marine Midland Arena in Buffalo, New York.

Second-seeded  defeated  in the championship game, 82–67, to win their first MAAC men's basketball tournament.

The Saints received an automatic bid to the 1999 NCAA tournament.

Format
All ten of the conference's members participated in the tournament field. They were seeded based on regular season conference records.

Bracket

References

MAAC men's basketball tournament